Salix fragilis is a scientific name that has historically been used for two different willows:

 Salix euxina, a non-hybrid species
 Salix × fragilis, the hybrid between Salix euxina and Salix alba